The Bibliothèque municipale de Colmar is a library in Colmar, France.

External links 
 http://bibliotheque.colmar.fr

Libraries in France
Buildings and structures in Colmar
Organizations based in Grand Est